{{DISPLAYTITLE:C21H27ClO5}}
The molecular formula C21H27ClO5 may refer to:

 EPI-001, the first inhibitor of the androgen receptor amino-terminal domain
 Ralaniten (EPI-002), an N-terminal domain antiandrogen which was never marketed

Molecular formulas